Anthidium pallidiclypeum is a species of bee in the family Megachilidae, the leaf-cutter, carder, or mason bees.

Distribution
Middle America and North America

References

External links
Anatomical drawings

pallidiclypeum
Insects described in 1963